John Lewis Mayo (July 26, 1925 – August 19, 2014) was an American professional baseball player who appeared in 139 Major League games for the Philadelphia Phillies between 1948 and 1953.

Biography
Mayo was born in Litchfield, Illinois, and his birth name was John Lewis. In 1947, shortly after graduating from the University of Notre Dame where he was captain of the baseball team, Mayo signed with the Phillies as an amateur free agent.

He appeared in three games of the 1950 World Series, and in one plate appearance, in Game 2, he drew a base on balls against Allie Reynolds of the New York Yankees as a pinch hitter for Robin Roberts leading off the tenth inning. Although Mayo was bunted safely to second base, he remained stranded there as the Yankees won, 2–1.

Mayo was part of the team that won the National League pennant in 1950 and was regarded as one of the Philadelphia Whiz Kids.

Following his retirement from Major League Baseball, Mayo retired to Youngstown, Ohio.

References

External links
Baseball Almanac
Baseball-Reference.com

1925 births
2014 deaths
Baltimore Orioles (IL) players
Baseball players from Youngstown, Ohio
Columbus Jets players
Major League Baseball outfielders
Montreal Royals players
Notre Dame Fighting Irish baseball players
People from Litchfield, Illinois
Philadelphia Phillies players
Richmond Virginians (minor league) players
Syracuse Chiefs players
Toronto Maple Leafs (International League) players
Utica Blue Sox players
Vandergrift Pioneers players